Żychce  is a village in the administrative district of Gmina Konarzyny, within Chojnice County, Pomeranian Voivodeship, in northern Poland.

For details of the history of the region, see History of Pomerania.

The village has a population of 227.

Notable residents
Heros von Borcke (1835–1895), Prussian cavalry officer
Josef Rudnick (1917–2009), businessman and politician

References

Villages in Chojnice County